Before the Fall is a 2015 Cambodian thriller film directed by Ian White. It was selected as the Cambodian entry for the Best Foreign Language Film at the 89th Academy Awards but it was not nominated.

Cast
 Ian Virgo as Sonny
 Antonis Greco as Tony

See also
 List of submissions to the 89th Academy Awards for Best Foreign Language Film
 List of Cambodian submissions for the Academy Award for Best Foreign Language Film

References

External links
 

2015 films
2015 thriller films
Cambodian thriller films
Khmer-language films
2010s French-language films
2010s English-language films
2015 multilingual films
Cambodian multilingual films